Jennifer Anne "Jennie" Page,  (born 12 November 1944) was chief executive of the London Millennium Dome project from 1 March 1995 until she resigned after a flawed opening night and poor early attendance at the start of 2000.

Education
Page attended Barr's Hill Grammar School for Girls. She was later educated at Royal Holloway, University of London where, as an undergraduate she had been awarded the George Smith Studentship and where she obtained a First-Class Honours BA degree in English in 1966 followed by a Driver postgraduate scholarship.

Early career
Prior to her appointment to the Dome project, she was Chief Executive of English Heritage from 1989 to 1995, having been recruited by the then chairman, Lord Montagu of Beaulieu (chairman 1984–1992). She later worked for chairman Jocelyn Stevens. On her appointment to the Millennium Commission, Stephen Dorrell said:
"The work of the Commission will leave a permanent mark of the face of the country and the job of the Chief Executive will be crucial to the Commission's success. Jennie Page is the right person for the job and we are delighted that she is going to join us." Jocelyn Stevens said:"I have been privileged to work very closely with Jennie since I have been Chairman of English Heritage. She has been my chief collaborator and strong support through a challenging period. I will miss her and her intuitive wisdom very much indeed and I wish her the same success in her new job that she has achieved at English Heritage. The Millennium Commission is singularly fortunate in obtaining Jennie's extraordinary combination of knowledge and management skills."

Before the appointments at English Heritage and the Dome project she was a civil servant in the Departments of the Environment and Transport, Britoil (formerly BNOC), London Docklands Development Corporation, and Pallas Group. She was also a non-executive director of Railtrack Group plc, a part-time appointment earning her £26,000 per year. Railtrack Group was placed into members' voluntary liquidation as RT Group on 18 October 2002.

She was also a non-executive director of The Equitable Life Assurance Society which almost collapsed financially in the millennium year. The Society issued claims for negligence against nine former directors, including Page, but in 2005 conceded total defeat in a four-year £3.2bn legal action to obtain compensation for policyholders. £10.2m was paid to the former directors to cover much of their legal expenses with Page paid just over £3m.

Position as Dome chief executive
Page was headhunted for the job by the then Heritage Secretary, Stephen Dorrell, according to The Observer. Page had previously worked for the London Docklands Development Corporation and had a reputation for a hardheaded style of management. Cracks developing behind the scenes began to show in January 1998 when Stephen Bayley, creative director of the project, resigned. He described Government Minister Peter Mandelson, whose project it had become, as a dictator reminiscent of: "an East German Stalinist".

Page resigned as Chief Executive on 5 February 2000. She had come under pressure after an opening night fiasco on 31 December 1999, followed by poor attendance in January 2000 and a revolt by sponsors. She was replaced by an unknown 34-year-old Frenchman, Pierre-Yves Gerbeau, known as "P-Y" and also nicknamed "the Gerbil" by the popular press, who had previously worked for the Disneyland Paris theme park. He was not thought particularly senior in the Disney organisation.

During her time at the Dome, and with compensation for her early departure, she was rumored to have received a salary of £500,000. Later, in June 2000, Page gave evidence to the House of Commons Select Committee for Culture, Media and Sport. She stated that "[t]he Dome had been seen by ministers and the public as a political project almost since its inception". Page claimed that she had asked ministers to step back from the project to calm the controversy surrounding it. In what was seen as a reference to the close interest in the Dome from Peter Mandelson, the former so-called "Minister for the Dome", and his successor Lord Falconer of Thoroton, Page told the committee: "I made several attempts to persuade ministers that standing back from the Dome would be good for them as well as good for the Dome". Page added to her criticism of ministers by insisting that the unexpected decision by the prime minister Tony Blair to invite one million schoolchildren to the Dome for free had had a significant impact on its income. It meant many parents would no longer pay to visit with their families, and forced the building of extra facilities for the large school parties. A decision to ban visitors arriving by car also cut the public's level of interest.

Post-Dome career
In 2001 Page married Jeremy David Orme, an accountant. In 2006, she was appointed vice-chairman of the Cathedrals Fabric Commission for England (now the Churches Conservation Trust) a statutory body, chaired by Frank Field MP and a  member of the  Church of England General Synod. The purpose of the trust is to: "[p]romote the care and conservation of the Cathedral churches of the Church of England".

References

Alumni of Royal Holloway, University of London
Commanders of the Order of the British Empire
English chief executives
1944 births
Living people
People educated at Barr's Hill School